The Dominican Church, Wissembourg, is a church in Wissembourg, Bas-Rhin, Alsace, France, formerly the church of a dissolved Dominican priory. Built in 1288, it became a registered monument historique in 1982. It was rebuilt and since 1981 has served as the cultural center "La Nef" housing a mediathèque and a concert hall.

References

Wissembourg
Wissembourg
Wissembourg